E. M. Wilhoit Building is a historic commercial building located at Springfield, Greene County, Missouri. It was built about 1926, and is a two-story, tan brick and concrete commercial building.  It has a flat roof and stepped parapet with terra cotta coping.  It features Colonial Revival-style influences.  It was built by Edward M. Wilhoit, who also built the Edward M. and Della C. Wilhoit House.

It was listed on the National Register of Historic Places in 2005.

References

Commercial buildings on the National Register of Historic Places in Missouri
Colonial Revival architecture in Missouri
Commercial buildings completed in 1926
Buildings and structures in Springfield, Missouri
National Register of Historic Places in Greene County, Missouri